Calk may refer to:
Caulkin, a blunt projection on a horseshoe
Calk, Kentucky, a community in Montgomery County, Kentucky, United States
Stephen Calk (born 1967), American entrepreneur

See also 
 Caulk, a material used for sealing
 Calque, a type of loan word
 Kalk (disambiguation)